Wallaby grass is a common name for several grasses native to Australia and may refer to:

Amphibromus
Austrodanthonia, also native to New Guinea and New Zealand
Rytidosperma